Edmonia Henderson (December 25, 1898 or 1900 – February 17, 1947) was an American classic female blues singer. She was active as a recording artist in the mid-1920s, recording at least 14 songs between 1924 and 1926. She later became an evangelist.

At various times, Henderson sang accompanied by Jelly Roll Morton, Tommy Ladnier, Lovie Austin, Eddie Heywood, and Johnny Dodds.

Career
Some sources state that she was born Jennie Katherine Edmonia Henderson, in Jefferson County, Kentucky (present-day Louisville), 1900.  However, the researchers Bob Eagle and Eric LeBlanc state that she was born Edmonia Kath Landen in Tennessee in December 25, 1898.

Henderson appeared in vaudeville, both as a solo artist and as part of Joe Clark's Revue, performing on the Theater Owners Booking Association circuit, including appearances in Baltimore, Chicago, and Nashville. In 1925, she performed in Radio Girls, another vaudeville revue, which included Bessie Williams, Mamie Jefferson, and Baby Badge.

Henderson's first recording was made in 1924. She recorded "Dead Man Blues" in 1926, with accompaniment by the writer of the song, Jelly Roll Morton, on piano. In 1927, a record of hers was released in the United Kingdom by the British record label Oriole, as part of its Race Series, under licence from Vocalion. The series also included recordings by Rosa Henderson and Viola McCoy.

By 1928, she was teaching and giving gospel concerts at the Griffith Conservatory of Music in Louisville. In 1932, she married and became the Reverend Edmonia Buckner.

Her work has appeared on various compilation albums, including The Rise and Fall of Paramount Records 1917–1927, Volume 1 (2013).

She is unrelated to Fletcher, Horace, Katherine, or Rosa Henderson.

Henderson died on February 17, 1947, in Louisville and was interred in Louisville Cemetery.

Selected discography

See also
List of classic female blues singers

References

External links
 Discography at The Honking Duck
 

Year of birth uncertain
1947 deaths
20th-century African-American women singers
American blues singers
Classic female blues singers
Vocalion Records artists
Okeh Records artists
Paramount Records artists
Musicians from Louisville, Kentucky
20th-century American singers
Singers from Kentucky
Blues musicians from Kentucky
Kentucky women musicians
20th-century American women singers